Mount Prestrud is an Antarctic peak over 2,400 m which rises from the southwestern part of the massif at the head of Amundsen Glacier, in the Queen Maud Mountains. In November 1911, a number of mountain peaks in this general vicinity were observed and rudely positioned by the South Pole Party under Roald Amundsen. Amundsen named one of them for Lieutenant Kristian Prestrud, first officer of the Fram and leader of the Norwegian expedition's Eastern Sledge Party to the Scott Nunataks. The peak described was mapped by the United States Geological Survey (USGS) from surveys and U.S. Navy aerial photography, 1960–64. For the sake of historical continuity, the Advisory Committee on Antarctic Names (US-ACAN) has selected this feature to be designated Mount Prestrud.

Mountains of the Ross Dependency
Queen Maud Mountains
Amundsen Coast